Aleksei Sergeyevich Brianskiy (born 14 September 1997) is a Russian swimmer. He competed in the men's 50 metre freestyle event at the 2016 Summer Olympics.

References

External links
 

1997 births
Living people
Russian male swimmers
Olympic swimmers of Russia
Swimmers at the 2015 European Games
Swimmers at the 2016 Summer Olympics
Place of birth missing (living people)
Medalists at the FINA World Swimming Championships (25 m)
Universiade medalists in swimming
Universiade bronze medalists for Russia
European Games bronze medalists for Russia
European Games gold medalists for Russia
Medalists at the 2017 Summer Universiade